Lieutenant General Rajan Bakhshi is a retired Indian Army General, who previously had served as the General Officer Commanding in Chief of the Central Command, in Lucknow. Prior to the aforementioned post, he was General Officer Commanding of the Leh-based XIV Corps of the Indian Army.

Early life and education
Lt Gen Rajan Bakhshi completed his school education at St. Xavier's School, Delhi and thereafter attended the Shri Ram College of Commerce, Delhi University.

Military career

After attending the Indian Military Academy, Dehradun, Lt Gen Bakhshi was commissioned into the 17 Horse on 21 Dec 1975. He has served in various command and instructional appointments during his long career, including at the National Defence Academy, Khadakvasala, and is a graduate of the Defense Services Staff College, Wellington.

References

Indian generals
People from Delhi
Shri Ram College of Commerce alumni
Delhi University alumni
Year of birth missing (living people)
Living people